The Pine Garden is a former Japanese military office in Hualien City, Hualien County, Taiwan.

History
The area was built in 1943 during the Japanese rule as a military office. The building used to be located inside a pine forest, thus earning the name. After the handover of Taiwan from Japan to the Republic of China in 1945, the facility was used as a vacation resort for the United States Armed Forces. In 2000, the Hualien County Government designated the area as a historical building. The government has renovated it into a cultural center and the Council for Cultural Affairs opened it as a tourist attractions to the public in 2001.

See also
 List of tourist attractions in Taiwan

References

External links

  

1943 establishments in Taiwan
Buildings and structures in Hualien County
Tourist attractions in Hualien County
Hualien City